Alopecosa cuneata is a species of spiders belonging to the family Lycosidae.

It is native to Eurasia.

References

cuneata
Spiders described in 1757
Taxa named by Carl Alexander Clerck
Spiders of Europe
Spiders of Asia